Gezim Osmani (born 1 January 1980) is a Swedish retired footballer.

Career
After playing for Malmö FF, the most successful team in Sweden, Osmani played in all levels of Swedish football from the top flight to the eighth division.

References

External links
 Gezim Osmani at Lagstatistik

Swedish footballers 
Living people
Association football midfielders
1980 births
Malmö FF players